A Pelo is a live studio album by Spanish rock band Platero y Tú. It was produced by Platero y Tú and published by DRO in 1996.

Track listing (CD1)

Track listing (CD2)

Personnel 
 Fito Cabrales: Vocals and guitar.
 Iñaki "Uoho" Antón: Guitar.
 Juantxu Olano: Bass.
 Jesús García: Drums.

Certifications

References

External links 
 Platero y Tú official website (in Spanish)

1996 albums
Platero y Tú albums
Spanish-language live albums